Mink Alphons Louis van der Weerden (born 19 October 1988) is a Dutch field hockey player who plays as a defender for German Bundesliga club Rot-Weiss Köln.

He started playing hockey at HCAS and has since also played for Oranje Zwart and Oranje-Rood. He joined Rot-Weiss Köln in the summer of 2020. Van der Weerden made his debut for the national team in 2010 and has since played in three Olympic Games, two World Cups and three European Championships. He studies physiotherapy.

Club career
Van der Weerden took up field hockey aged 10 in 2000 following his mother at HCAS. Later he moved to Oranje Zwart. After Oranje Zwart merged in 2016 with EMHC he signed a four-year contract for the newly formed club HC Oranje-Rood. On 29 January 2020 it was announced he would join Rot-Weiss Köln at the end of the season. In the 2021–22 season he won his second Bundesliga title in a row.

International career
At the 2012 Summer Olympics, he competed for the national team in the men's tournament where the Netherlands won silver. A penalty corner specialist, he was credited with the second victory in group play, over Belgium. He also had a goal in the final against Germany, and ended as the tournament's top scorer with eight goals. In June 2019, he was selected in the Netherlands squad for the 2019 EuroHockey Championship. They won the bronze medal by defeating Germany 4–0. After the 2020 Summer Olympics van der Weerden announced his retirement from the national team.

Honours

International
Netherlands
Olympic silver medal: 2012
European Championship: 2015, 2017, 2021
Hockey World League: 2012–13

Club
Oranje Zwart
Euro Hockey League: 2014–15
Hoofdklasse: 2013–14, 2014–15, 2015–16

Rot-Weiss Köln
 Bundesliga: 2019–2021, 2021–22

Individual
Olympic top goalscorer: 2012
Champions Trophy top goalscorer: 2010, 2014
Hoofdklasse top goalscorer: 2013–14

References

External links
 

1988 births
Living people
People from Geldrop
Sportspeople from North Brabant
Dutch male field hockey players
Male field hockey defenders
Field hockey players at the 2012 Summer Olympics
2014 Men's Hockey World Cup players
Field hockey players at the 2016 Summer Olympics
2018 Men's Hockey World Cup players
Field hockey players at the 2020 Summer Olympics
Olympic field hockey players of the Netherlands
Olympic silver medalists for the Netherlands
Olympic medalists in field hockey
Medalists at the 2012 Summer Olympics
Oranje Zwart players
HC Oranje-Rood players
Men's Hoofdklasse Hockey players
Rot-Weiss Köln players
Men's Feldhockey Bundesliga players